Katzrin (also Qatzrin) is an Israeli settlement organized as a local council in the Golan Heights. Known as the "capital of the Golan", it is the second-largest locality there after Majdal Shams, and the largest Israeli settlement. It is the seat of Golan Regional Council.

The international community considers Israeli settlements in the Golan Heights illegal under international law, though the Israeli government disputes this.

Geography
To the south of Katzrin is the Sea of Galilee, to the north Mount Hermon, and to the west are the Upper Galilee hills of Israel.

History

Bronze Age to Early Islamic period
The site was occupied from the Middle Bronze Age, continuing into the Iron Age, the Hellenistic and Roman periods (during the latter it was once destroyed), while the most substantial structural remains date from the Late Roman, Byzantine and Early Islamic periods (3rd–4th to mid-8th centuries), when the site was a Jewish village with a synagogue.

The ancient Jewish settlement served as an important trading location in the region, but started to decline with the change of trading routes after the Islamic conquest. The village was destroyed in an earthquake in CE 746–749. As a result of the earthquake the location was most probably abandoned by the declining Jewish community.

Mamluk period
During the Mamluk period (13th–14th centuries), it was a Muslim village and a mosque was built upon the ruins of the synagogue.

Ottoman, French and Syrian periods
In the 1880s, Kisrin, at the east edge of the modern town, was described as "a small Bedawin winter village, with a group of beautiful oak trees and old ruins". From the late 19th century to 1967, the village was occupied by Bedouin and a settled population. Since 1920 and until the independence of Syria in 1944, the area was under the jurisdiction of the French mandate. The Syrian farm of Fakhoura was just to the north-east and had about 250 inhabitants before its depopulation in 1967.

Israeli occupation and annexation

The Israeli settlement of Katzrin was established in 1977 as a planned urban center for the Golan based on a decision of the Israeli government in November 1973. Construction began in 1976. In 1981, under the Golan Heights Law, Israel applied Israeli civil law in the Golan Heights (including Katzrin). This law was condemned internationally and by the United Nations security council. Katzrin serves as  a district town, that provides educational, administrative and cultural services to the surrounding region.

Demography
The early residents were young couples and professionals from Tel Aviv and Haifa.
At the end of the 1980s, a large number of Jews from the former Soviet Union settled in Katzrin. Today, a third of the city's residents are Jews from Soviet Union and their descendants. Religious educators also moved to Katzrin, establishing a religious day school and a premilitary academy. Katzrin is divided into six neighborhoods: Gamla, Naveh, Kedma, Afek, Batra, and Chen. Building of infrastructure for an additional neighborhood, Yovel, began in 2018.

There are also 30 Druze families and few Sunni Muslim families as well living in the town.

Economy

The Golan Heights Winery is located in Katzrin. In 2008, the large Chinese solar company Suntech Power and Israeli company Solarit Doral built Israel's largest solar power station, a 50 kW rooftop project near the town, and connected it to the electric grid.  The Mey Eden  mineral water bottling plant and the Golan Olive Oil Mill are in Katzrin. Golan Olive Oil produces some 50 tons of olive oil which is sold locally and exported. During the olive harvest season, which begins in October, visitors can watch the processing procedure, from crushing to bottling.

A tourist attraction in Katzrin is the Magic of the Golan, a special effects movie screened at the local mall that depicts the spectacular scenery of the region.

Near Katzrin in 2015, Afek Oil & Gas, a subsidiary of Genie Energy Ltd. and controls Genie Energy Ltd.'s oil and gas exploratory project in Northern Israel and the Golan Heights region, discovered significant oil and natural gas reserves.  As of October 2015, an estimate of the volume of resources and to what extent they may be extractable is unknown.

Education and culture
Ohalo College, a teacher training college, moved to Katzrin in 1988. In 2010, the college opened a department devoted to sustainable development and renewable energy. Students explore the  interrelationship of different renewable energy sources and their impact on the sustainability of development in the Golan and Galilee.

Archaeology

Prior to 1967, the antiquities site on the outskirts of Katzrin was a closed military zone and off limits to archaeological research. Investigation by Israeli archaeologists commence in 1972. Katzrin ancient village and synagogue was reconstructed and  opened to the public as a "Talmudic village" set in a national park.
The Golan Antiquities Museum in Katzrin houses archeological findings from the region and screens an audiovisual presentation about Gamla, a Jewish town in the Golan Heights that fought the Romans in the 1st century.

Town twinning
Katzrin has a friendship agreement with the Mikulov, Czech Republic. In 2012, a Czech delegation visiting Israel and the Golan Heights attended a cornerstone ceremony for Mikulov Park in Katzrin attended by the Czech Deputy Ambassador to Israel. Special features of the park are a miniature replica of the clock tower of Mikulov and an audio station where visitors can learn about the history of Mikulov.

Notes

References

External links

Katzrin town website

Mixed Israeli settlements
Populated places established in 1977
Local councils in Northern District (Israel)
1977 establishments in the Israeli Military Governorate
Israeli settlements in the Golan Heights